David Spears (born 21 December 1963) is a Canadian former cyclist. He competed in the team time trial at the 1988 Summer Olympics.

References

External links
 

1963 births
Living people
Canadian male cyclists
Olympic cyclists of Canada
Cyclists at the 1988 Summer Olympics
Sportspeople from Greater Sudbury
Commonwealth Games medallists in cycling
Commonwealth Games silver medallists for Canada
Cyclists at the 1990 Commonwealth Games
Medallists at the 1990 Commonwealth Games